Paul Bryar (born Gabriel Paul Barrere; February 21, 1910 – August 30, 1985) was an American actor. In a career spanning nearly half a century, he appeared in numerous films and television series.

Career 
Bryar appeared in nearly 220 films between 1938 and 1983, although most of his roles were small in size. He made his film debut in the Harold Lloyd comedy Professor Beware. Some B-movies during the 1940s and 1950s like Jungle Siren, Lady from Chungking, Parole, Inc. and The Bob Mathias Story gave him the chance to play substantial supporting roles.

Bryar appeared in three movies directed by Alfred Hitchcock, including Vertigo (1958), where he had an uncredited role as the friendly Police Captain who accompanies James Stewart to the coroner's inquest. The other Hitchcock films were Notorious (1946) and The Wrong Man (1956). He also appeared in a 1955 episode of Alfred Hitchcock Presents. Byrar was typecast as a policeman in numerous other films, including Rebel Without a Cause (1955) and some Bowery Boys films.  Bryar also played bartenders, district attorneys, sheriffs, photographers and guards. He appeared in Charles Laughton's film classic The Night of the Hunter (1955) as a hangman and family father who feels depressed about his work. Bryar also played Card Player #1 who quits the game before the main card player, Macon (Donnelly Rhodes), threatens the Sundance Kid (Robert Redford) in the opening scene of Butch Cassidy and the Sundance Kid (1969). Many have mistakenly assumed that it was Bryar's character who threatened the Sundance Kid.

From the 1950s until the early 1980s, Bryar appeared in about 150 television shows. He was seen in The Twilight Zone, Bonanza, Batman, Little House on the Prairie, Emergency!, Bewitched, The Andy Griffith Show, The Beverly Hillbillies, Leave It to Beaver; Kung Fu and Hart to Hart. Paul Bryar also appeared in the first season of Barnaby Jones; episode titled, "To Denise, with Love and Murder"(04/22/1973).
He had a recurring role as Sheriff Harve Anders in the short-lived series The Long, Hot Summer between 1965 and 1966. His last role was a small part in the film Heart Like a Wheel, two years before his death.

Personal life 
He was married to actress Claudia Bryar until his death in 1985. They had three children, including Paul Barrere, guitarist and singer with the rock band Little Feat.

Selected filmography 

 Professor Beware (1938) as Harry - Radio Patrolman (uncredited)
 Tenth Avenue Kid (1938) as Wheeler
 Artists and Models Abroad (1938) as Hotel Clerk (uncredited)
 Midnight (1939) as Porter (uncredited)
 Waterfront (1939) as Committeeman (uncredited)
 Rio (1939) as Guard (uncredited)
 The Roaring Twenties (1939) as Gangster (uncredited)
 Hold That Woman! (1940) as 'Duke' Jurgens
 Marked Men (1940) as Joe Mellon
 Arise, My Love (1940) as Desk Clerk (uncredited)
 You're Out of Luck (1941) as Benny, the Henchman-Driver
 The Man Who Lost Himself (1941) as Bar Waiter (uncredited)
 The Gang's All Here (1941) as Bob (uncredited)
 Desperate Cargo (1941) as Henchman Desser
 Badlands of Dakota (1941) as Barfly (uncredited)
 The Miracle Kid (1941) as Rocco
 Paris Calling (1941) as Paul
 Sealed Lips (1942) as Henchman Spike (uncredited)
 Don Winslow of the Navy (1942, Serial) as Kramer - [Chs. 3-4]
 Man from Headquarters (1942) as Knuckles
 Duke of the Navy (1942) as Bunco Bisbee
 The Strange Case of Doctor Rx (1942) as Bailiff (uncredited)
 Junior G-Men of the Air (1942, Serial) as Chemist [Ch. 5] (uncredited)
 Spy Smasher (1942, Serial) as Lawlor
 Mississippi Gambler (1942) as Evans (uncredited)
 The Mystery of Marie Roget (1942) as Detective (uncredited)
 Eagle Squadron (1942) as Frenchman (uncredited)
 Invisible Agent (1942) as German Soldier (uncredited)
 Jungle Siren (1942) as Sergeant Mike Jenkins
 Sin Town (1942) as Grady (uncredited)
 Eyes of the Underworld (1942) as Taylor (uncredited)
 Foreign Agent (1942) as Jerry the bartender
 Destination Unknown (1942) as German Henchman (uncredited)
 Criminal Investigator (1942) as Stuart
 Queen of Broadway (1942) as Rosy
 Lady from Chungking (1942) as Pat O'Roulke
 Sherlock Holmes and the Secret Weapon (1942) as Swiss Waiter (uncredited)
 The Adventures of Smilin' Jack (1943, Serial) as Herr Bauer - German Spy [Chs. 6-7] (uncredited)
 Silent Witness (1943) as Blackie
 The Crystal Ball (1943) as Maurice, Captain of Waiters (uncredited)
 Don Winslow of the Coast Guard (1943) as Water Gate Controller (uncredited)
 Sarong Girl (1943) as Jake
 Crime Doctor (1943) as First Reporter in Court (uncredited)
 Corvette K-225 (1943) as Stoker (uncredited)
 Flesh and Fantasy (1943) as Harlequin (uncredited)
 The Desert Song (1943) as French Captain (uncredited)
 Lost City of the Jungle (1946, Serial) as Casino Bartender [Chs. 1-2, 5, 10, 12] (uncredited)
 Larceny in Her Heart (1946) as Tim Rourke
 Blonde for a Day (1946) as Tim Rourke
 Shadows Over Chinatown (1946) as Mike Rogan
 Notorious (1946) as Photographer (uncredited)
 Gas House Kids (1946) as Shadow Sarecki
 The Razor's Edge (1946) as Frenchman (uncredited)
 Lady Chaser (1946) as Garry
 Swell Guy (1946) as Companion (uncredited)
 The Return of Monte Cristo (1946) (uncredited)
 Blind Spot (1947) as Police Officer Harmon (uncredited)
 The Beginning or the End (1947) as Army Officer (uncredited)
 Three on a Ticket (1947) as Tim Rourke
 The Millerson Case (1947) as Harley Rumford (uncredited)
 The Corpse Came C.O.D. (1947) as Reporter (uncredited)
 Brute Force (1947) as Harry (uncredited)
 Robin Hood of Texas (1947) as Ace
 Ride the Pink Horse (1947) as Policeman (uncredited)
 Killer McCoy (1947) as Joe - Welsh's Bodyguard (uncredited)
 The Chinese Ring (1947) as Police Sergeant (uncredited)
 The Judge Steps Out (1948) as Dining Truck Driver (uncredited)
 Joe Palooka in Fighting Mad (1948) as Detective Lieutenant
 Campus Sleuth (1948) as Houser
 To the Victor (1948) as Detective on Train (uncredited)
 Smart Woman (1948) as Joe the Bartender (uncredited)
 I Wouldn't Be in Your Shoes (1948) as Guard #2
 The Dude Goes West (1948) as Smith (uncredited)
 The Babe Ruth Story (1948) as Sam (scenes deleted)
 Walk a Crooked Mile (1948) as Ivan (uncredited)
 Rogues' Regiment (1948) as Saigon Chief of Police (uncredited)
 Bungalow 13 (1948) as Police Officer (uncredited)
 Parole, Inc. (1948) as Charley Newton
 Alaska Patrol (1949) as Cmdr. Braddock
 Dynamite (1949) as Christmas Party Guest (uncredited)
 Shockproof (1949) as Man in Car (uncredited)
 Flaxy Martin (1949) as Policeman with Witness (uncredited)
 Bad Boy (1949) as Gambler (uncredited)
 Mississippi Rhythm (1949) as Sad Sam Beale
 Follow Me Quietly (1949) as Police Sgt. Bryce (uncredited)
 Barbary Pirate (1949) as First Mate (uncredited)
 Madame Bovary (1949) as Bailiff (uncredited)
 Prison Warden (1949) as Convict (uncredited)
 The Story of Molly X (1949) as Mr. Lang (uncredited)
 Mary Ryan, Detective (1949) as Chuck (uncredited)
 Chicago Deadline (1949) as Bartender (uncredited)
 Bride for Sale (1949) as Barrows (uncredited)
 The Great Lover (1949) as French Waiter (uncredited)
 When Willie Comes Marching Home (1950) as French Resistance Fighter (uncredited)
 Under My Skin (1950) as Max (uncredited)
 Square Dance Katy (1950) as Taxi Driver
 Armored Car Robbery (1950) as Car 6 Patrolman at Pier 5 (uncredited)
 The Underworld Story (1950) as Helen's Father (uncredited)
 Triple Trouble (1950) as Prison Policeman Wilson (uncredited)
 The Petty Girl (1950) as Policeman #3 (uncredited)
 The Toast of New Orleans (1950) as Minor Role (uncredited)
 The Fuller Brush Girl (1950) as Husband Watching TV (uncredited)
 Blues Busters (1950) as Bimbo
 The Sun Sets at Dawn (1950) as Truck Driver (uncredited)
 Joe Palooka in the Squared Circle (1950) as Det. Lt. Roderick
 Southside 1-1000 (1950) as Jack, FBI Man Cab Driver
 Call of the Klondike (1950) as Fred Foley
 Sierra Passage (1950) as Bartender (uncredited)
 Navy Bound (1951) as C.P.O. Robert Garrells
 Valentino (1951) as Photographer (uncredited)
 Ghost Chasers (1951) as Reporter (uncredited)
 Cavalry Scout (1951) as Bartender (uncredited)
 According to Mrs. Hoyle (1951) as Willie
 Never Trust a Gambler (1951) as Undersheriff's Assistant (uncredited)
 Let's Go Navy! (1951) as Policeman at Desk (uncredited)
 The People Against O'Hara (1951) as Det. Howie Pendleton (uncredited)
 The Mob (1951) as Policeman Cullen (uncredited)
 You Never Can Tell (1951) as Prisoner (uncredited)
 Leave It to the Marines (1951) as Cpl. Pappodopoli
 Sky High (1951) as Sgt. Kurt Petrov
 Callaway Went Thataway (1951) as Gaffer (uncredited)
 Death of a Salesman (1951) as Subway Guard (uncredited)
 Aladdin and His Lamp (1952) as Nervous Man (uncredited)
 Hold That Line (1952) as Coach Rowland
 Sound Off (1952) as George - Headwaiter (uncredited)
 Lydia Bailey (1952) as Guard (uncredited)
 Glory Alley (1952) as Cab Driver (uncredited)
 Has Anybody Seen My Gal? (1952) as Doorman at Poker Game (uncredited)
 What Price Glory (1952) as Charmaine's Uncle (uncredited)
 The Rose Bowl Story (1952) as Assistant Coach Martin (uncredited)
 Arctic Flight (1952) as Happy Hogan
 Because of You (1952) as First Man (uncredited)
 Torpedo Alley (1952) as Bartender (uncredited)
 Treasure of the Golden Condor (1953) as Guard (uncredited)
 The Story of Three Loves (1953) as River Policeman (segment "Equilibrium") (uncredited)
 White Lightning (1953) as Stew Barton
 She's Back on Broadway (1953) as Ned Colby (uncredited)
 Man in the Dark (1953) as Freddie - Bartender (uncredited)
 Roar of the Crowd (1953) as Max Bromski
 South Sea Woman (1953) as Captain of Gendarmes (uncredited)
 Dangerous When Wet (1953) as Pierre
 Vice Squad (1953) as Lt. Cade (uncredited)
 Clipped Wings (1953) as Air Police Sergeant (uncredited)
 99 River Street (1953) as River Street Bartender (uncredited)
 All American (1953) as Taxi Driver (uncredited)
 Hot News (1953) as Doc Allen
 Easy to Love (1953) as Mr. Barnes
 Executive Suite (1954) as Stork Club Waiter (uncredited)
 Tennessee Champ (1954) as Ring Announcer (uncredited)
 The Bowery Boys Meet the Monsters (1954) as Police Officer Martin (uncredited)
 The Far Country (1954) as Sheriff Walters (uncredited)
 Brigadoon (1954) as Waiter (uncredited)
 Rogue Cop (1954) as Patrolman Marx (uncredited)
 A Star Is Born (1954) as Bartender at Racetrack (uncredited)
 The Bob Mathias Story (1954) as Bill Andrews
 The Yellow Mountain (1954) as Miner (uncredited)
 The Prodigal (1955) as Townsman (uncredited)
 Seven Angry Men (1955) as Train Fireman (uncredited)
 Interrupted Melody (1955) as Florida Conductor (uncredited)
 Mad at the World (1955) as Matt, Police Detective
 The Night of the Hunter (1955) as Bart the Hangman (uncredited)
 No Man's Woman (1955) as Sandy (the bartender)
 It's Always Fair Weather (1955) as Carl - Maitre d' (uncredited)
 Rebel Without a Cause (1955) as Desk Sergeant #2 (uncredited)
 Hell on Frisco Bay (1955) as Hotel Doorman (uncredited)
 Inside Detroit (1956) as Sam Foran
 The Killer Is Loose (1956) as Greg Boyd
 Crime in the Streets (1956) as Mr. Daniels - Lenny's Father (uncredited)
 Lust for Life (1956) as Inspector (uncredited)
 Tea and Sympathy (1956) as Alex (uncredited)
 Rumble on the Docks (1956) as Police Captain Callahan (uncredited)
 Stagecoach to Fury (1956) (uncredited)
 The Wrong Man (1956) as Interrogation Officer (uncredited)
 The Quiet Gun (1957) as Silva (uncredited)
 Chain of Evidence (1957) as Jenkins (uncredited)
 Mister Cory (1957) as Charlie - Dealer (uncredited)
 The Big Land (1957) as First Bartender (uncredited)
 The Shadow on the Window (1957) as Bartender (uncredited)
 Silk Stockings (1957) as Reporter (uncredited)
 Teenage Doll (1957) as Helen's Father
 The Joker Is Wild (1957) as Heckler (uncredited)
 The Helen Morgan Story (1957) as Bartender (uncredited)
 Looking for Danger (1957) as Maj. Harper
 Young and Dangerous (1957) as Desk Sergeant (uncredited)
 Don't Go Near the Water (1957) as Lt. Cmdr. Flaherty (uncredited)
 Teenage Thunder (1957) as Bert Morrison
 Too Much, Too Soon (1958) as Bill (uncredited)
 Vertigo (1958) as Capt. Hansen (uncredited)
 Gunman's Walk (1958) as Bartender (uncredited)
 The Naked and the Dead (1958) as General (uncredited)
 Al Capone (1959) as Police Inspector (uncredited)
 The Rabbit Trap (1959) as Bus Driver (uncredited)
 It Started with a Kiss (1959) as Majordomo (uncredited)
 The Wreck of the Mary Deare (1959) as Port Official (uncredited)
 Vice Raid (1959) as Internal Affairs Hearing Officer (uncredited)
 Ocean's 11 (1960) as Cop (uncredited)
 Leave It to Beaver” (1960) as Sargeant Petersen 
 Squad Car (1960) as Police Lt. Beck
 Cimarron (1960) as Mr. Self - Politician (uncredited)
 The Big Bankroll (1961) as Police Detective (uncredited)
 Saintly Sinners (1962) as Duke
 All Fall Down (1962) as Manager of Sweet Shop (scenes deleted)
 How the West Was Won (1962) as Auctioneer's Assistant (uncredited)
 Man's Favorite Sport? (1964) as Bartender at Rotating Bar (uncredited)
 The Quick Gun (1964) as Mitchell
 Sex and the Single Girl (1964) as Toll Gate Guard (uncredited)
 The Great Race (1965) as Policeman (uncredited)
 A Very Special Favor (1965) as Mac - Hotel Doorman (uncredited)
 The Third Day (1965) as Pete - Bartender (uncredited)
 Made in Paris (1966) as Attendant (uncredited)
 The Long, Hot Summer (1965-1966, TV series, recurring role) as Sheriff Harve Anders
 The Reluctant Astronaut (1967) as First Bus Driver (uncredited)
 P.J. (1968) as Gatekeeper (uncredited)
 The Shakiest Gun in the West (1968) as Man at Bar (uncredited)
 Butch Cassidy and the Sundance Kid (1969) as Card Player #1
 The Spectre of Edgar Allan Poe (1974) as Thomas W. White
 Funny Lady (1975) as Cleaning Man
 Dawn: Portrait of a Teenage Runaway (1976, TV Movie) as Counterman
 A Change of Seasons (1980) as Man at Table
 Modern Romance (1981) as Man in Phone Booth (uncredited)
 Heart Like a Wheel'' (1983) as Matt, Card Player (final film role)

References

External links 

 

1910 births
1985 deaths
People from Manhattan
Male actors from New York City
American male film actors
20th-century American male actors
American male television actors